Cassidy Rae Joyce (born June 7, 1976) is a retired American actress. She starred in the made-for-television movie Crowned and Dangerous with Yasmine Bleeth in 1997. She is best known for her roles on the series Hyperion Bay as the character Trudy Tucker and on My Family and Me as the character Davina Mayhan.. She resides in Santa Clarita, California as of 2022. She has 3 sons and 1 daughter with her husband Chace Unruh who is a chiropractor.

Early life and family
Rae was born in Clermont, Florida, to Andrea and Raymond Joyce. She is married to Chace Unruh.

Career 
Rae had the recurring role of Sarah Owens on Melrose Place, a character she continued in the spin-off Models Inc.

In 2011, after taking a ten-year break to get married and start a family, Rae starred in the short film "Swordbearer". Two years later, she starred in another short film, "Fluffy 1947".

Filmography

Film

Television

References

External links

1976 births
Living people
American television actresses
American film actresses
Actresses from Florida
People from Clermont, Florida
21st-century American women